Jovana Nogić (Serbian Cyrillic: Јована Ногић; born 17 December 1997)  is a Serbian professional basketball player. She plays for Campos Promete and Serbia national team.

References

External links

Profile at eurobasket.com
Profile at fiba.com

1997 births
Living people
Serbian women's basketball players
Small forwards
Basketball players from Belgrade